A.C. Orestias (full name Athletic Club of Orestias/ ) is a Greek volleyball club based in Orestias. It was founded in 1970 and it has important presence in the Greek volleyball championship. Orestias was the finalist of the championship at three times and one time the finalist of the Greek cup. Nevertheless the most important moment was the presence of the club in the final of the CEV Challenge Cup, in 1995.

History
A.C. Orestias was founded in 1970. The first presence in the  A1 Ethniki championship was in 1984. Since 1989, Orestias was one of the most powerful teams in the championship. At those years Orestias had notable players such as Nikos Samaras and Theodoros Baev. The club played three times in the finals of the championship and one time in the final of the cup. In 1995, Orestias reached to the final of the CEV Challenge Cup but was defeated by Pallavolo Parma. The decline of Orestias started with the relegation in 2007. Orestias remained seven years in the lower division. In 2014 the club returned to the highest level again. In 2017 and 2018, the club relegated in back to back years and is now competing in Beta Ethinki.

Honours
CEV Challenge Cup
Finalist (1): 1995
Greek Championship
Finalist (3): 1992, 1997, 1998 
Greek Volleyball Cup
Finalist (1): 1993

References

External links
Official page

Greek volleyball clubs